Jeffrey Kim Schroeder (born February 4, 1974, Los Angeles, California) is an American musician. He is best known as a guitarist in the alternative rock band the Smashing Pumpkins, which he joined in 2006, and with which he has recorded five studio albums. After vocalist and guitarist Billy Corgan, Schroeder is the second longest-serving member of the Smashing Pumpkins.

Initially replacing co-founder James Iha, Schroeder made his live debut with the Smashing Pumpkins on May 22, 2007, in Paris, France, as the band embarked on an extensive comeback tour in support of the album Zeitgeist. Following the tour's completion, Schroeder graduated from the role of touring guitarist and became a full member of the band. Described by Corgan as a key collaborator on subsequent albums Oceania (2012) and Monuments to an Elegy (2014), Schroeder remained in the band after Iha rejoined in 2018, ushering in a three-guitar lineup.

Early days and the Lassie Foundation

Schroeder began taking formal guitar lessons from David Koval (Dakoda Motor Co. and Breakfast with Amy) at age twelve. When he was eighteen, he joined the band the Violet Burning, only to become a guitarist and one of the founding members of the shoegazing band the Lassie Foundation a few years later. The group described their style as "pink noise pop". Schroeder played guitar on three full-length albums and toured with the band from 1996 until they went on hiatus, in 2006.

He joined the Smashing Pumpkins' touring lineup in 2007 and also recorded for the new Lassie Foundation album in late 2007 and early 2008.

The Smashing Pumpkins
On April 6, 2007, rock rumor webzine Buddyhead reported that Schroeder was the new guitarist for the Smashing Pumpkins, replacing James Iha. Schroeder toured with the band throughout 2007 and 2008 and appeared in the music videos for "Tarantula", "That's the Way (My Love Is)", and "G.L.O.W."

Following the departure of Ginger Pooley in 2010, Schroeder remained the only member of the band besides Corgan still present from the 2007 revival show in Paris. On April 17, 2010, Schroeder played the first show with the newest lineup of the Smashing Pumpkins, which included Jimmy Chamberlin's replacement, Mike Byrne, on drums, and the Electric Prunes bassist Mark Tulin.

In 2018, after performing and recording with the Smashing Pumpkins for over eleven years, Schroeder remained within the band's core lineup, alongside returning founding members James Iha and Jimmy Chamberlin. Reflecting on the importance of this, Schroeder noted: "I personally had a pretty touchy moment for myself in that I was sitting there tuning my guitar [in the studio], and then I looked around and saw Billy, Jimmy, and James. And then I look through the window and see [producer] Rick Rubin, and I thought like, 'Wow. This is a really special moment.' To think that when I joined the band it was such a different scenario, that to even think twelve years later you'd be at this point, it was really unfathomable. So I really kind of took a second and took it in."

Gear

When performing live, Schroeder plays Gibson guitars, including the Les Paul, the Gibson SG, and the ES-335; and Fender models like the Stratocaster, the Telecaster, and the Jazzmaster. He also uses Washburn guitars live. Since 2010, he has used a Randall amp MTS system, with custom preamp modules by Salvation Mods.

Personal life
In 2014, Schroeder was finishing his PhD in comparative literature at UCLA, where he specializes in Asian American literature, Francophone literature, and critical theory.

Discography
with The Smashing Pumpkins
 Teargarden by Kaleidyscope (2009–2014)
 Oceania (2012)
 Monuments to an Elegy (2014)
 Shiny and Oh So Bright, Vol. 1 / LP: No Past. No Future. No Sun. (2018)
 Cyr (2020)
 Atum: A Rock Opera in Three Acts (2023)

References

External links
 The Lassie Foundation official website

1974 births
Living people
American rock guitarists
American male guitarists
The Smashing Pumpkins members
University of California, Los Angeles alumni
Rhythm guitarists
American people of German descent
American musicians of Korean descent
American alternative rock musicians
Alternative rock guitarists
Guitarists from Los Angeles